Piel a Piel is the second studio album by Spanish singer Marcos Llunas, released in 1994 by PolyGram Latino. The album was produced and mainly written by Spanish singer-songwriter Juan Carlos Calderón, and was promoted by its lead singles "Guapa", "Mañana" and "La de Siempre".

Track listing

Personnel
Adapted from the Piel a Piel liner notes:

Performance credits

Marcos Llunas – vocals, arranger
Robbie Buchanan – piano, keyboards, programing
Pablo Aguirre – piano, keyboards, programing
John "J.R." Robinson – drums
Abraham Laboriel – bass
Neil Stubenhaus – bass
Michael Landau – electric guitar
George Doering – acoustic guitar
Luis Conte – percussion
Dan Higgins – saxophone, flute, synthesizer
Francis Benítez – background vocals
Leyla Hoyle – background vocals
Kenny OBrian – background vocals
Isela Sotelo – background vocals
Mary Jamison – background vocals
Michael Markman – concert master, violin
Olga Babtchinskaia – violin
Walter Gomes Desouza – violin
James Getzoff – violin
Edith Markman – violin
Hakop Mekinian – violin
Dennis Molchan – violin
R.F. Peterson – violin
Guillermo Romero – violin
Radzan Kuyumijan – violin
Thi B. Nyugen – violin
Tania Boyaird – violin
Vage Ayrikyan – cello
Waldemar de Almeida – cello
Virginia Burward-Hoy – cello, viola
Armen Ksadjikian – cello, viola
Jorge Moraga – viola
Harry Shirinian – viola
Hershel Wise – viola 
Diane Gilbert – viola

Technical credits

Juan Carlos Calderón – producer, arranger, director, choir arrangements
Christina Abaroa – arranger, coordination, producer
Alejandro Monroy – director, arranger 
Manuel Calderón – artistic direction
Randy Kerber – strings arrangements
Andy Armer – strings arrangements
Mary Jamison – choir arrangements
Benny Faccone – engineer
Hal Sacks – engineer
Bryan Stott – engineer
Rodolfo Vásquez – engineer
Moogie Canazio – mixer
Mauricio Guerrero – additional engineer
Bernie Grundman – mastering engineer
Manuel Oriona – photography
Javier Romero – graphic design

Recording and mixing locations

Ocean Way Recording Studios, Hollywood, CA – recording
Skip Saylor Recording, Hollywood, CA - recording
Sound Chamber Recorders, Hollywood, CA – recording
Studio Masters, Los Angeles, CA – recording
Westlake Recording Studios, Hollywood, CA – mixing

References 

1994 albums
Spanish-language albums
Albums produced by Juan Carlos Calderón